California Western School of Law is a private law school in San Diego, California. It is one of two successor organizations to California Western University, the other being Alliant International University. The school was founded in 1924, approved by the American Bar Association (ABA) in 1962, and became a member of the Association of American Law Schools (AALS) in 1967.

History
California Western is San Diego's oldest law school and was originally chartered in 1924 by Leland Ghent Stanford as a private graduate institution called Balboa Law College. Balboa Law College expanded to include undergraduate and other graduate studies and changed its name to Balboa University.

In 1952, Balboa University became affiliated with the Southern California Methodist Conference and changed its name to California Western University, and the law school was relocated to downtown, San Diego.  In 1960 California Western received approval from the American Bar Association. In 1973, the law school relocated within downtown San Diego to its current downtown campus at 350 Cedar Street. In 1975, the school ended its affiliation with Cal Western's successor school, US International University, and became an independent secular law school. In 1980, the new trimester system was announced, allowing two entering classes per academic year, reducing individual class size and allowing students the opportunity to graduate in two years rather than the standard three.

In January 2000, California Western opened a new law library building at 290 Cedar Street,  dedicated by U.S. Supreme Court Justice Anthony Kennedy.

Sean M. Scott  was named the school's new president and dean in August 2020.

Academics
The law school teaches the J.D. curriculum plus a dual-degree option, specifically:
 J.D./Master of Business Administration (with San Diego State University)

California Western also offers the Master of Laws (LL.M.) degree in Trial Advocacy with a Specialization in Federal Criminal Law as well as an M.C.L./LL.M. for foreign law students.

For 2021, California Western accepted 56.05% of applicants, with 25.43% of those accepted enrolling, and with enrollees having an average LSAT score of 153 and average undergraduate GPA of 3.26.

Programs and research centers
Research centers include:
 The California Innocence Project, part of the national network of innocence projects, is a nonprofit clinical program based at California Western in which law professors and students work to free wrongly convicted prisoners in California. The law students assist in the investigation of cases where there is strong evidence of innocence, write briefs in those cases, and advocate in all appropriate forums for the release of the project's clients. Founded in 1999, the California Innocence Project reviews more than 2,000 claims of innocence from California inmates each year. The project was founded by Professors Justin Brooks and Jan Stiglitz and is currently directed by Prof. Brooks.
 William J. McGill Center for Creative Problem Solving
 Institute for Criminal Defense Advocacy
 National Center for Preventive Law

Faculty
The law school has 25 tenured faculty members, three faculty members on the tenure track and six legal skills professors. From 2010 to 2014, 28 tenured and tenure-track faculty members published 18 books, 15 book chapters, 55 law review articles and 75 other scholarly publications. Tenure-track or tenured faculty who were members of the faculty in the last seven years wrote 70 additional publications.

The law school created six endowed professorships to support faculty members in their research and scholarship. California Western has also been named to the President's Higher Education Community Service Honor Roll for the past five years.

Student debt
According to U.S. News & World Report, the average indebtedness of 2016 graduates who incurred law school debt was $143,592 (not including undergraduate debt), and 88% of 2016 graduates took on debt.

Notable people

Alumni
 Anthony J. Battaglia, U.S. district court judge for the Southern District of California
 Scott C. Black, former judge advocate general of the United States Army
 Bruce Blakeman, Nassau County (New York) county executive and commissioner of the Port Authority of New York and New Jersey
 Shana Dale, former deputy administrator of NASA
 David Francis, former member of the United States cycling team
 James B. Gibson, former mayor of Henderson, Nevada
 M. James Lorenz, U.S. district court judge for the Southern District of California
 Bruce E. MacDonald, former U.S. Navy vice admiral and judge advocate general of the Navy
 Brian Maienschein, member of the California state assembly
 Afa Ripley Jr., attorney general of American Samoa
 Margaret Catharine Rodgers, United States federal judge
 David Roger, district attorney of Clark County, Nevada
 Kevin Sandkuhler, retired brigadier general in the United States Marine Corps
 Michael Tsai, former minister of national defense, Taiwan
 Christina Bobb, OANN broadcaster, touted falsehoods about the 2020 election on behalf of Donald Trump, then apparently lied about whether Donald Trump had turned over all classified materials at Mar-A-Lago, potentially putting herself at risk of prosecution for obstruction of justice.

Faculty
 Justin Brooks, criminal defense attorney and director of the California Innocence Project
 Ricardo Garcia, the 11th public defender for Los Angeles County

References

External links
 

ABA-accredited law schools in California
Universities and colleges in San Diego
Educational institutions established in 1924
Independent law schools in the United States
1924 establishments in California